Bharateeyans is an upcoming Indian Hindi-language action film written & directed by Deena Raj. The film features actors from across India such as Nirroze Putcha, Subha Ranjan, Sonam Thendup Barphungpa, Samaira Sandhu, Peden O Namgyal and Rajeswari Chakraborty in lead roles, and is Produced by Shankar N Adusumilli under his "Bharat American Creations" banner while Satya Kashyap is composing the music and cinematography by Jayapal Reddy Nimmala. The First look and Teaser of the film were launch on 13 August 2022, In the presence of Vivek Agnihotri the director of film The Kashmir Files and the film is expect to release later in 2022.

The story of 'Bharateeyans' revolves around a group of six youngsters who belong to various regions of India. The film is said to evoke Patriotism in the younger generation of India, Vivek Agnihotri added "It's an earnest tribute to every Indian with a solid message on Patriotism and perseverance, "Bharateeyans" will bring a new identity to the word "Indians".

Plot 
Six strangers, three men, three women meet at unknown place. They don't know each other. They start their journey without knowing what dangers are waiting for them. Plot revolves around  love, family, action and patriotism.

Cast 
 Nirroze Putcha as Telugu
 Subha Ranjan as Bhojpuri
 Sonam Thendup Barphunga as Nepali
 Samaira Sandhu as Punjabi
 Peden O Namgyal as Tripura
 Rajeswari Chakraborty as Bengali
 Phurba Lama
 Mahendra Bagdas
 Sujata
 Anupam

Production 
Dr. Shankar Naidu, a well-known surgeon, who has established multiple organizations such as Carolina Colorectal Surgery Group, Apollo Urgent Care, and co-founded Bharat Today, Nationalist Hub before collaborating with Writer Deena Raj, who previously wrote industry hit films like Preminchukundam Raa, Premante Idera, Kalisundam Raa, Eeswar (2002 film), Lahiri Lahiri Lahirilo, Sardukupodaam Randi, Nagaram Nidrapotunna Vela and Sakhiya. Bharateeyans will be Deena Raj's directorial debut. Bharateeyans went into production in February and wrapped in March 2022, the film was shot in multiple locations such as Kalimpong, Gangtok, Rangpo, NHPC Dam, Chalsa, West Bengal and the climax was shot at  Sikkim.

Soundtrack 
The music is composed by Satya Kashyap who previously worked on films like Iravatham, Law, Kanayya.

References

External links
 

2022 films
2020s Hindi-language films
2022 directorial debut films
Films shot in Sikkim